Nada (born Nada Malanima November 17, 1953 in Gabbro (it), Rosignano Marittimo, Province of Livorno) is an Italian singer. She was nicknamed Il pulcino del Gabbro (the little chick of Gabbro).

Career

Nada's début occurred at the age of fifteen at the 1969 Sanremo Music Festival with the song Ma che freddo fa, which gave her a sudden success, also with the Spanish language version Hace frío ya. The following year she participated in the festival again, singing Pa' diglielo a ma''' together with Ron. She also took part in Canzonissima, a popular TV programme, with Che male fa la gelosia.

In 1971 she won the Sanremo Music Festival with Il cuore è uno zingaro, together with Nicola Di Bari, obtaining notable international success. In Sanremo again in 1972 she was third with Il re di denari. Later she returned to Sanremo in 1987 (Bolero), in 1999 (Guardami negli occhi) and in 2007 (Luna in piena).

In 1983 she was voted "singer of the year" with her summer hit Amore disperato. 
In 1998 the Italian band Super B gained a notable success with a cover of Nada's song Amore Disperato.

Her 2004 album Tutto l'amore che mi manca (produced by John Parish, former producer of PJ Harvey) was awarded as best independent album of the year in Italy. The album also contains a duet with Howe Gelb.
Also the following studio album Luna in piena won the award for best independent album in 2007.

On June 21, 2009 Nada participated in the Amiche per l'Abruzzo concert at San Siro in Milan, a line-up of all female Italian stars organised by Laura Pausini to raise money to help the city of L'Aquila, devastated by the earthquake earlier on that year.
Nada joined a special project band consisting of Marina Rei, Paola Turci and Carmen Consoli on stage for the final song of the first part, singing a rousing rendition of her classic Ma che freddo fa.

2011 sees the release of her new studio album Vamp.

In 2016, her single "Senza un perché" was featured on the HBO series The Young Pope.

Discography

Studio albums
1969 - Nada1970 - Io l'ho fatto per amore1973 - Ho scoperto che esisto anch'io1974 - 1930: Il domatore delle scimmie1976 - Nada1983 - Smalto1984 - Noi non cresceremo mai1986 - Baci Rossi1992 - L'anime nere1999 - Dove sei sei2001 - L'amore è fortissimo e il corpo no2004 - Tutto l'amore che mi manca2007 - Luna In Piena #54 ITA
2011 - Vamp #70 ITA
2014 - Occupo poco spazio2016 - L'amore devi seguirlo2019 - È un momento difficile, tesoro2022 - La paura va via da sé se i pensieri brillanoLive albums

1998 - Nada Trio2005 - L'Apertura (Nada & Massimo Zamboni)
2005 - CD Live Brescia ("Mucchio Selvaggio Extra" supplement)
2008 - Live Stazione Birra #60 ITA

Compilations
1994 - Malanima: Successi e Inediti 1969-19942006 - Le Mie Canzoncine 1999-2006Singles
1969 - Les bicyclettes de Belsize1969 - Ma che freddo fa #1 ITA
1969 - Biancaneve #23 ITA
1969 - Che male fa la gelosia #6 ITA
1969 - L'anello #11 ITA
1970 - Pà diglielo a mà #10 ITA
1970 - Bugia #52 ITA
1970 - Io l'ho fatto per amore #47 ITA
1971 - Il cuore è uno zingaro #1 ITA
1972 - Re di denari #2 ITA
1972 - Una chitarra e un'armonica #24 ITA
1973 - Brividi d'amore #27 ITA
1978 - Pasticcio universale #37 ITA
1981 - Dimmi che mi ami che mi ami che tu ami che tu ami solo me #15 ITA
1982 - Ti stringerò #17 ITA
1983 - Amore disperato #1 ITA
1984 - Balliamo ancora un po' #35 ITA
1987 - Bolero1992 - Guarda quante stelle1999 - Guardami negli occhi1999 - Inganno2004 - Senza un perché2004 - Piangere o no2006 - Scalza2007 - Luna in piena #76 ITA
2007 - Pioggia d'estate2008 - Stretta2008 - Novembre2011 - Il comandante perfetto2011 - La canzone per dormire2011 - Stagioni2015 - Non sputarmi in faccia2015 - La bestiaFilmography

Books
2003 - Le mie madri2008 - Il mio cuore umano2012 - La grande casa''

References

External links 

1953 births
Living people
People from the Province of Livorno
Italian pop singers
Italian rock singers
Spanish-language singers of Italy
Sanremo Music Festival winners
20th-century Italian women singers
21st-century Italian women singers